North Sheen railway station is in the London Borough of Richmond upon Thames, in southwest London, and is in Travelcard Zone 3. The station, on the eastern edge of Richmond, is named after the North Sheen area which, in 1965, was absorbed by Kew.

It was opened by the Southern Railway on 6 July 1930. The station and all trains serving it are now operated by South Western Railway.

North Sheen station serves the area between Mortlake and Richmond stations on the South Western Railway main line rail service.

Footbridge 
North Sheen station is just off Manor Road, where there is a level crossing. Originally, the railway was planned to run through a narrow cutting, allowing Green Lane (as Manor Road was then called) to be carried over the railway by a road bridge.

The station had a footbridge allowing access to the island platforms from both sides of the level crossing, but now only the northern half of that bridge remains. A new bridge, on the opposite side of the level crossing to the station, was opened in October 2013 after members of the public had been invited to submit designs. When the level crossing is closed, passengers wishing to gain access to the platforms from the south side of Manor Road have to use both bridges.

Access 
The station is not wheelchair-accessible, nor is the footbridge.

Services 

The typical off-peak service from the station is:

8 trains per hour to London Waterloo, of which:
4 run direct via Clapham Junction
2 run circuitously via Richmond, Kingston and Wimbledon
2 run circuitously via Richmond and Hounslow

Notes and references

External links 

 Transport for London: North Sheen Station

Railway stations in the London Borough of Richmond upon Thames
Former Southern Railway (UK) stations
Railway stations in Great Britain opened in 1930
Railway stations served by South Western Railway
Richmond, London
1930 establishments in England